Aedes (Stegomyia) mediopunctatus is a species complex of zoophilic mosquito belonging to the genus Aedes. It is endemic to Sri Lanka

References

External links
Huangmyia Reinert, Harbach & Kitching, 2009 - Mosquito Taxonomic Inventory

mediopunctatus